Mirjam Cvetič is a Slovenian-American theoretical physicist at the University of Pennsylvania, where she is Fay R. and Eugene L. Langberg Professor of Physics and of Mathematics. Her research includes the applications of string theory and M-theory to black hole behavior and particle phenomenology, and she has published highly cited works on supersymmetry.

Education and career
Cvetič earned bachelor's and master's degrees at the University of Ljubljana in 1979 and 1981, respectively. She completed her doctorate at the University of Maryland, College Park in 1984. Her dissertation, Origin of Mass Hierarchies in Gauge Theories, was supervised by Jogesh Pati. After working as a researcher at the Stanford Linear Accelerator Center and the University of Pennsylvania, she joined the University of Pennsylvania faculty in 1989. She became Class of 1965 Endowed Term Professor in 1999, and Fay R. and Eugene L. Langberg Endowed Chair in 2003.

As of 2020, she is the lead editor of Physical Review D. She is also a member and co-PI of the Simons Collaboration on Special Holonomy in Geometry, Analysis, and Physics.

Recognition
Cvetič was named a Fellow of the American Physical Society in 2001, "for her work in a wide range of topics in supergravity and string theory, from non-perturbative gravitational effects such as black holes and domain walls to their phenomenological consequences".

She won the University of Maryland Physics Distinguished Alumni Award in 2007. In 2019, the Alexander von Humboldt Foundation gave her their Carl Friedrich von Siemens Research Award, funding her for a visit to the Max Planck Institute for Physics.

References

Further reading

External links

Year of birth missing (living people)
Living people
Slovenian physicists
Slovenian women physicists
American physicists
Women physicists
University of Ljubljana alumni
University of Maryland, College Park alumni
University of Pennsylvania faculty
Fellows of the American Physical Society